Jim Woodward may refer to:

 James F. Woodward (born 1941), professor of history and adjunct professor of physics
 Jim Woodward (politician), American politician in the Idaho State Senate